The 1987–88 UTSA Roadrunners men's basketball team represented the University of Texas at San Antonio in the 1987–88 college basketball season. This was head coach Ken Burmeister's second season at UTSA. They played their home games at the Convocation Center. The Roadrunners finished the season 22–9, 13–5 in TAAC play to finish in third place. They won the TAAC tournament to advance to the NCAA tournament for the first time in program history. Playing as the No. 14 seed in the Southeast region, UTSA was beaten by No. 3 seed Illinois in the round of 64.

Roster

Schedule and results
Source
All times are Central

|-
!colspan=9 style=| Non-conference Regular season

|-
!colspan=9 style=| TAAC Regular season

|-
!colspan=9 style=| Non-conference Regular season

|-
!colspan=9 style=| TAAC Regular season

|-
!colspan=9 style=| TAAC tournament 

|-
!colspan=9 style=| NCAA tournament

References

UTSA Roadrunners men's basketball seasons
Utsa
UTSA Roadrunners basketball
UTSA Roadrunners basketball
Utsa